Nuhash Humayun (Bengali: নুহাশ হুমায়ূন ) is a Bangladeshi film director and screenwriter. Nuhash's notable works include Sincerely Yours, Dhaka, Pett Kata Shaw, and Moshari. His theatrical debut Sincerely Yours, Dhaka had its world premiere at the 2018 Busan International Film Festival and is currently on Netflix. His upcoming film Moving Bangladesh will be release in 2023.

Early life
Nuhash Humayun was born on 1 January 1992 in Dhaka, Bangladesh to Humayun Ahmed and Gultekin Khan. His parents divorced at a early age. He stayed with his mother. His father was a novelist, dramatist, screenwriter, filmmaker, songwriter, scholar, and professor. After divorce he married actress Maher Afroz Shaon. He died on 19 July 2012. Nuhash's grandfather Faizur Rahman Ahmed was a Bangladeshi freedom fighter who died during the war. Zafar Iqbal and Ahsan Habib are his uncles. He has three sisters Nova Ahmed, Sheila Ahmed, Bipasha Ahmed and two half brothers Nishad Humayun and Ninith Humayun from his father's second marriage. His sister Shila Ahmed worked as a child actress in his father's works.

Career
Nuhash Humayun's early works include short films like Paperfrog, 700 Taka and Pizza Bhai. He first came to limelight after his film Sincerely Yours, Dhaka was selected for the Bangladesh's entry for the 93rd Academy Awards.

He became famous for his web series Pett Kata Shaw. His direction and metaphors in the series were praised. This series is selected for Harbor section in the 52nd edition of IFFR.

His short film Moshari won awards in many international festivals. For which he was signed by Anonymous Content and Creative Artists Agency in 2022.Jordan Peele and Riz Ahmed became executive producers of the film. It is the first ever oscar qualifying film from Bangladesh.

After the success of Moshari American over the top platform Hulu gave him the chance to direct a episode of their show Bite Size Halloween called Foreigners Only.

Filmography

Web Works

Films

Short films

References

1992 births
Living people
Bangladeshi film directors
Bangladeshi screenwriters
Children of Humayun Ahmed